Octa may refer to:

Places 
 Octa, Missouri
 Octa, Ohio

People 
 Octa of Kent (6th century), king of Kent

Other uses 
 Octa (unit), a proposed unit of information by Donald Knuth denoting 64 bit
 Office of the Chief Trade Adviser
 Orange County Transportation Authority
 Oregon-California Trails Association
 Oregon Cannabis Tax Act
 Overseas Countries and Territories Association
 Optical coherence tomography angiography, an imaging modality for visualizing vasculature
 Octa-, a prefix meaning eight

See also 
 Okta (disambiguation)